Arutani–Sape, also known as Awake–Kaliana or Kalianan, is a proposed language family that includes two of the most poorly documented languages in South America, both of which are now extinct. They are at best only distantly related. Kaufman (1990) found a connection convincing, but Migliazza & Campbell (1988) maintained that there is no evidence for linking them. The two languages are,

Arutani (also known as Aoaqui, Auake, Auaque, Awake, Oewaku, Orotani, Uruak, Urutani)
Sape (also known as Caliana, Chirichano, Kaliana, Kariana)

Kaufman (1990) states that a further connection with Máku (Maku of Roraima/Auari) is "promising". (See Macro-Puinavean languages.)

Vocabulary

Migliazza (1978)
Migliazza (1978) gives the following Swadesh list table for Uruak, Sape, and Máku ("Maku"):

{| class="wikitable sortable"
! no. !! gloss !! Uruak !! Sape !! Máku
|-
| 1 || I || maykate/ma-/tsa- || mɨ || teːne
|-
| 2 || thou || kaykate/ka- || kapɨ || eːne
|-
| 3 || we || materya || mɨyono || teːkene
|-
| 4 || this || kiʔa || tɨsa || ki
|-
| 5 || that || ayta || tɨsami || kwa
|-
| 6 || who || maʔayokə || pante || toči
|-
| 7 || what || maya || pemente || čini
|-
| 8 || not || ãʔãy || atsam/ɨka || laʔa
|-
| 9 || all || kitate || kawen || peʔtaka
|-
| 10 || many || kaʔtyaw || kawen || eːsuʔu
|-
| 11 || one || kyoana/kyano || koka || nokuðamu
|-
| 12 || two || komana || kɨrya || baʔta
|-
| 13 || big || kwaya || konən || bote
|-
| 14 || long || šawi || karya || kaxi
|-
| 15 || small || sikipi || to || kudi
|-
| 16 || woman || kari || kapay || neːlabə
|-
| 17 || man || maʔkya || kwa || laːsəba
|-
| 18 || person || kina || kamon || dzoʔkude
|-
| 19 || fish || kotom || pə || meʔkəsa
|-
| 20 || bird || yopsa || čam || iːduba
|-
| 21 || dog || toari || to || dzoʔwi
|-
| 22 || louse || koʔka || čo || iːne
|-
| 23 || tree || šapi || tapa || oːba
|-
| 24 || seed || kuka || ku || küːte
|-
| 25 || leaf || aña || muyra || deːmu
|-
| 26 || root || aša || tu || leːmekeči
|-
| 27 || bark || kõhã || kui/kuy || čiːmu
|-
| 28 || skin || kõhã || kuy || čːmu
|-
| 29 || flesh || mitsa || mɨan || muči
|-
| 30 || blood || kaña || tsom || leːme
|-
| 31 || bone || mo || wina || aːmu
|-
| 32 || grease || wiñaya || kun || eːkünü
|-
| 33 || egg || kokama || kupi || küʔte
|-
| 34 || horn || širipya || wina || eːkatso
|-
| 35 || tail || mašya || upi || neːto
|-
| 36 || feather || oša || ičam upa || kuːte
|-
| 37 || hair || oša || pa || kuːte
|-
| 38 || head || kwate || moynaku || keːte
|-
| 39 || ear || watika || awi || čikaʔte
|-
| 40 || eye || kohap || amku || sukute
|-
| 41 || nose || wa/kwa || ayku || pi
|-
| 42 || mouth || maʔa || itu || wɨːči
|-
| 43 || tooth || ka || pɨka || wuːmu
|-
| 44 || tongue || takõhã || matu || duːte
|-
| 45 || claw || šopti || ičam aypa || sukuči
|-
| 46 || foot || šate || ikora || basuku
|-
| 47 || knee || korokopsa || mɨney || basəkate
|-
| 48 || hand || maša/mama || piča apa || suku
|-
| 49 || belly || tsya || tukuy || sɨkɨči
|-
| 50 || neck || šoropaña || pokoy || lipite
|-
| 51 || breasts || kotsa || wi || čüčü
|-
| 52 || heart || kirakote || pokowi || səbuku
|-
| 53 || liver || ika || mapi || iːsa
|-
| 54 || drink || oyta/ayta || pe || mi
|-
| 55 || eat || pa/kapa || ko/ku || ki
|-
| 56 || bite || psa/pasa || pu || bü
|-
| 57 || see || kina || mow || ku
|-
| 58 || hear || ko || man || ne
|-
| 59 || know || kina || mow || nimi
|-
| 60 || sleep || anə || paku/ku || we
|-
| 61 || die || atay || siya || kinə
|-
| 62 || kill || rio (beat) || kaya || šipinu
|-
| 63 || swim || ša || pə || lawa
|-
| 64 || fly || šan || karu || nü
|-
| 65 || walk || ma || paru || te
|-
| 66 || come || mana || ma || na
|-
| 67 || lie down || kio/taa || pɨre || ða
|-
| 68 || sit || naka || maye || sɨkɨ
|-
| 69 || stand || kara || pa || kəy
|-
| 70 || give || matso || emeyma || se
|-
| 71 || say || mataka/tsama || mo || šini/šibu
|-
| 72 || sun || uši || ñam || keʔle
|-
| 73 || moon || aʔtap || tapo || ya
|-
| 74 || star || okihat || ñayino || ðaoku
|-
| 75 || water || akohã || nam || naʔme
|-
| 76 || rain || akohã || nam posoe || naʔme
|-
| 77 || stone || muka || takuypa || liːne
|-
| 78 || sand || iñãkosa || inoku || lunükü
|-
| 79 || earth || iñã || inokučin || boʔte
|-
| 80 || cloud || karapaso || usəyna || sapənawi
|-
| 81 || smoke || šana || yui || čipe
|-
| 82 || fire || ani || šoko || nühẽ
|-
| 83 || ash || šoni || tukutu || meːte
|-
| 84 || burn || asipa || šoko || we/niʔ
|-
| 85 || path || aʔma || mu || iːkilu
|-
| 86 || mountain || piʔa || takwa || wiːke
|-
| 87 || red || araʔwi || ayña || leme
|-
| 88 || green || atehe || šanurua || nüčü
|-
| 89 || yellow || pišio || pusia || kaləmadə
|-
| 90 || white || araway || sae || kaləmate
|-
| 91 || black || sipan/soson || tsaiña || kabi/weʔči
|-
| 92 || night || tose || useyna || iːkisu
|-
| 93 || hot || kuri || ɨrɨa || we
|-
| 94 || cold || roma/kima || unkoya || antsu/mihu
|-
| 95 || full || topi || ukwa || suku
|-
| 96 || new || koma || yenkoña || asi
|-
| 97 || good || taseri || amayñakoa || kuduma/eːdi
|-
| 98 || round || siari || način || kuməsa
|-
| 99 || dry || šona || patokwa || kaːte
|-
| 100 || name || rawi || marua || entse
|}

See also

Macro-Puinavean languages

Notes

References
Hammarström, Harald. 2010. 'The status of the least documented language families in the world'. In Language Documentation & Conservation, v 4, p 183

Further reading
Armellada, Cesareo de & Baltasar de Matallana. 1942. Exploración del Paragua. Boletín de la Sociedad Venezolana de Ciencias Naturales 8, 61-110.
Coppens, Walter. 2008 [1983]. Los Uruak (Arutani). In Miguel Ángel Perera (ed.) Los aborígenes de Venezuela, 2nd edition, Volume 2, 705-737. Caracas: Fundación La Salle de Ciencias Naturales/Instituto Caribe de Antropología y Sociología.
Rosés Labrada, Jorge Emilio, Thiago Chacon & Francia Medina. 2020. Arutani (Venezuela and Brazil) – Language Snapshot. In Peter K. Austin (ed.) Language Documentation and Description 17, 170-177. London: EL Publishing.
Jorge Emilio Rosés Labrada & Francia Medina (2019). Sapé (Venezuela) — Language Snapshot. In Peter K. Austin (ed.) Language Documentation and Description, vol 16. London: EL Publishing. pp. 169-175.

 
Indigenous languages of Northern Amazonia
Languages of Brazil
Endangered indigenous languages of the Americas
Proposed language families
Macro-Puinavean languages